Alexandros Koryzis (1885 – 18 April 1941) was a Greek politician who served briefly as the prime minister of Greece in 1941.

Career
Koryzis assumed this role on 29 January 1941, when his predecessor, the dictator Ioannis Metaxas died of throat cancer, during the Greco-Italian War. Prior to this, Koryzis had been governor of the Bank of Greece.

Of Arvanite heritage, Koryzis was born on the small island of Poros in Greece, where a museum dedicated to his life and contribution exists today.

Prime Minister Metaxas had declined British offers of direct military assistance on the grounds that this could be used as a justification for German intervention in support of their Italian allies. Koryzis however agreed to the dispatch of "W Force" - a British and Dominion force of two infantry divisions and an armoured brigade. 

Although largely powerless, as the government was effectively controlled by King George II, Koryzis still bore the burden of the German invasion which commenced on 6 April of the same year. Less than two weeks later, on 18 April, as German troops marched towards Athens and the city was placed under martial law, he committed suicide by shooting himself. The cause of his death was initially reported to be a heart attack, probably to avoid causing mass panic in Athens.

References

External links
 

1885 births
1941 suicides
20th-century prime ministers of Greece
People from Poros
Arvanites
Finance ministers of Greece
Prime Ministers of Greece
Greek fascists
Greek anti-communists
Greek people of World War II
Greek politicians who committed suicide
Suicides by firearm in Greece
Poros
Fascist politicians